Michael Klauß (born 15 September 1970) is a German former professional footballer who played as a forward.

References

External links 
 

1970 births
Living people
German footballers
Association football forwards
Germany under-21 international footballers
Bundesliga players
2. Bundesliga players
KFC Uerdingen 05 players
VfL Bochum players
FC St. Pauli players
Rot-Weiß Oberhausen players
Wuppertaler SV players
SV Darmstadt 98 players